The 1954 Georgia gubernatorial election was held on November 2, 1954.

Lieutenant Governor Marvin Griffin won the Democratic primary on September 8 with 36.52% of the vote and 302 out of 410 county unit votes. At this time, Georgia was a one-party state, and the Democratic nomination was tantamount to victory. Griffin won the November general election without an opponent.

This was the final of Melvin Thompson's three failed bids for Governor.

Democratic primary

County unit system
From 1917 until 1962, the Democratic Party in the U.S. state of Georgia used a voting system called the county unit system to determine victors in statewide primary elections.

The system was ostensibly designed to function similarly to the Electoral College, but in practice the large ratio of unit votes for small, rural counties to unit votes for more populous urban areas provided outsized political influence to the smaller counties.

Under the county unit system, the 159 counties in Georgia were divided by population into three categories. The largest eight counties were classified as "Urban", the next-largest 30 counties were classified as "Town", and the remaining 121 counties were classified as "Rural". Urban counties were given 6 unit votes, Town counties were given 4 unit votes, and Rural counties were given 2 unit votes, for a total of 410 available unit votes. Each county's unit votes were awarded on a winner-take-all basis.

Candidates were required to obtain a majority of unit votes (not necessarily a majority of the popular vote), or 206 total unit votes, to win the election. If no candidate received a majority in the initial primary, a runoff election was held between the top two candidates to determine a winner.

Candidates
 Marvin Griffin, incumbent Lieutenant Governor
 Charlie Gowen, State Representative from Brunswick
 Fred Hand, Speaker of the Georgia House of Representatives
 Tom Linder, Commissioner of Agriculture
 Melvin Thompson, former Governor (1947–48)

Results

General election

Results

References

1954
Gubernatorial
Georgia
November 1954 events in the United States